Mostafa El Said Mussad is the former minister of higher education of Egypt. He was part of the Qandil Cabinet and is a member of the Freedom and Justice Party. He is described as Islamist engineering professor by Ashraf Khaled.

Education
Mussad graduated from Cairo University in 1973.

Career
Mussad is an engineering professor. He worked at Cairo University's faculty of engineering and was the head of the education committee for the Muslim Brotherhood's Freedom and Justice Party. He was a member of the team in charge of Morsi's presidential campaign. And he developed the educational policy for his campaign.

He was appointed minister of higher education as part of the Qandil cabinet on 2 August 2013, and was one of the Freedom and Justice Party members serving in the cabinet. It was his first cabinet post. Mussad's term ended on 16 July 2013. Hossam Eisa replaced him in the post.

References

Living people
Cairo University alumni
Academic staff of Cairo University
Qandil Cabinet
Higher education ministers of Egypt
Freedom and Justice Party (Egypt) politicians
Year of birth missing (living people)